Raymond Francœur (born June 14, 1946) is a politician from Quebec, Canada. He was an Action démocratique du Québec Member of the National Assembly for the electoral district of Portneuf from 2007 to 2008.

Francœur was born in Beauport, Quebec (now Quebec City). After his collegiate studies at CEGEP de Sainte-Foy, he was enrolled in the Canadian Forces as an officer lieutenant. After his military service, he held various directing positions, including the director for the Quebec & Saguenay–Lac-Saint-Jean division of Scott Paper Company, and a Quebec City region director of a local milk company. He was also a marketing and/or sales director for various local institutions including automobile dealerships (while also being co-owner) and insurance companies. He also taught for six years at CEGEP Sainte-Foy in the marketing department. He was a member for various local Club organisations including the Lions Club, Club Rotary and Club Optimiste in the Quebec City area.

Before his election, he served as mayor of Sainte-Christine-d'Auvergne.

Francœur was first elected in the 2007 election with 46% of the vote. Liberal incumbent Jean-Pierre Soucy finished second with 32% of the vote. Francœur took office on April 12, 2007.

Footnotes

External links
 

1946 births
Living people
Action démocratique du Québec MNAs
Mayors of places in Quebec
Politicians from Quebec City
21st-century Canadian politicians